Prodoxus weethumpi is a moth of the family Prodoxidae. It is found in the United States in the south-western and north-eastern edges of the Mojave Desert in southern California and Nevada, north-western Arizona and south-western Utah.

The wingspan is 8.75-10.6 mm for males and 9.2-13.6 mm for females. The forewings are uniform solid light tan. The hindwings are gray with a brown tinge along the front edge. Adults are on wing from March to early May.

The larvae feed on Yucca brevifolia. They feed inside a superficial gallery in the thickening exocarp. This gallery also serves as the diapause and pupation site. Diapause can last at least two years, and likely much longer, before pupation and emergence.

Etymology
The species name is derived from wee thump of the Paiute language, meaning "ancient ones", alluding to the longevity of Yucca brevifolia.

References

Moths described in 2005
Prodoxidae